Longitudinal axis may refer to:

In anatomy, going from head to tail; see 
In aviation, nose to tail of a plane; see 
 In geography, an imaginary line passing through the centroid of the cross sections along the long axis of an object